World of Music was a CBC classical music series. In 1968 Glenn Gould introduced a series of six television specials. The series continued into the early 1970s.

References

CBC Television original programming
1968 Canadian television series debuts
1971 Canadian television series endings